The 2017 Karaliaus Mindaugo taurė, also known as KIDY Tour – Karaliaus Mindaugo taurė for sponsorship purposes, was the second edition of the Lithuanian King Mindaugas Cup. On 18 February 2016 it was announced that Kaunas would host the tournament. 

Lietuvos rytas were the defending champion, but were eliminated in the quarter-finals by Juventus.

Žalgiris won their first title, beating Lietkabelis 84–63 in the final. Juventus won bronze medals, defeating Vytautas. Žalgiris forward Edgaras Ulanovas was awarded as MVP of the tournament.

Format changes
Tournament format was slightly changed before 2017. Quarterfinals were separated from final matches and played in home team arenas. Due to these changes tournament length was extended from 3 to 6 days.

Qualified teams
Eight highest ranked teams after the first half of the 2016–17 LKL regular season qualified to the tournament.

Draw
The draw of the 2017 Karaliaus Mindaugo taurė was held on 9 January 2017 at 14:00 EET in Town Hall of Kaunas. The seeded teams were paired with the non-seeded teams for the quarterfinals. The location of these matches was determined by the luck of the draw.

Bracket

Three-Point Contest

 Deividas Gailius was selected as Margiris Normantas replacement.
 Tadas Rinkūnas was selected as Ben Magden replacement.

Slam Dunk Contest

 Rytis Pipiras was selected as Drew Gordon replacement.
 Isaiah Hartenstein was unable to participate due to an injury

References and notes

External links
Karaliaus Mindaugo taurė at LKL website

2017
2016–17 in Lithuanian basketball
February 2017 sports events in Europe
Sports competitions in Kaunas
21st century in Kaunas
Sport in Pasvalys
Sports competitions in Alytus
Sport in Utena